The Long March 2C (LM-2C), also known as the Chang Zheng 2C (CZ-2C), is a Chinese orbital launch vehicle, part of the Long March 2 rocket family. Developed and manufactured by the China Academy of Launch Vehicle Technology (CALT), the Long March 2C made its first launch on 9 September 1982. It is a two-stage launch vehicle with storable propellants, consisting of Nitrogen Tetroxide and Unsymmetrical Dimethylhydrazine. The launch vehicle was derived from the DF-5 ICBM.

Several variants of this launch vehicle have been built, all using an optional third solid motor stage:

 2C/SD: Commercial satellite launcher with a multi-satellite smart dispenser allowing delivery of two satellites simultaneously
 2C/SM: Version for delivery of small satellites to high orbits
 2C/SMA: Improved version of the 2C/SM

According to the website Gunter's Space Page, in addition to the launches listed in the following table, there may have been six additional CZ-2C launches during 2014 and 2015. These possible launches apparently were conducted at the Taiyuan Satellite Launch Center on the following dates: 9 January 2014, 7 August 2014, 2 December 2014, 7 June 2015, 20 August 2015, and 23 November 2015; five of these six launches were apparently successful, while the launch on 7 August 2014 appears to have failed. However, due to the lack of additional sources for these six launches, they are not currently included in the following launch list.

Aerodynamic grid fins were added on the Long March 2C in 2019 to help guide falling stages away from populated areas. China is studying using reusable rocket technology in the future. A fairing recovery system through parachutes has been tested during the Yaogan 30-09 and Yaogan 30-10 launches in order to improve control of debris landing inland on potentially populated areas.

Launch Statistics

List of launches

Launch failures

Shijian 11-04 launch failure 
On 18 August 2011, a Long March 2C rocket failed during the launch of the Shijian 11-04 satellite. During the powered flight phase of the second stage, the connecting mechanism between vernier engine no.3 and the servo-control mechanism of the second stage failed, which led to the loss of attitude control on the second stage.

References

External links 

 
 

Long March (rocket family)
Vehicles introduced in 1982